Bena bicolorana, the scarce silver-lines, is a moth of the family Nolidae. The species was first described by Johann Kaspar Füssli in 1775. It is found in Europe Turkey, Armenia, Asia Minor and Syria.

Technical description and variation

The forewings are bright apple green; the costal edge yellowish white; inner margin narrowly white; inner and outer lines finely yellowish white, oblique, the outer from costa before apex; hindwing white; fringe white in both wings; in subsp. conspersa subsp. nov. (53 m), from Amasia, the ground colour is blue green, densely covered with pale scales; the costal edge and lines white. Larva green, smooth; the 3rd segment with a yellow tipped dorsal hump; subdorsal and spiracular lines yellow; some pale yellow lateral stripes. The wingspan is 40–50 mm.

Biology
The moth flies in one generation from mid-June to August .

The larvae feed on oak.

Notes
The flight season refers to Belgium and the Netherlands. This may vary in other parts of the range.

References

External links

"10449 Bena bicolorana (Fuesslin, 1775) - Eichen-Kahneule, Große Kahneule, [Großer Kahnspinner, Eichen-Kahnspinner]". Lepiforum e. V. Retrieved August 3, 2020. 
"Grote groenuil Bena bicolorana". De Vlinderstichting. 

Chloephorinae
Moths of Europe
Taxa named by Johann Kaspar Füssli